Carlos Alberto Soto Olivares (born 12 March 1965) is a Chilean former professional footballer who played as a defensive midfielder

Club career
Soto is a product of Universidad Católica youth system, where he coincided with players such as Eduardo Soto, Luis Abarca and Mario Lepe. He stayed with the club until the 1990 season, with a stint on loan at O'Higgins in the 1987 Segunda División, when they got promotion to the top division. With Universidad Católica, Soto won the Copa República, the 1983 Copa Polla Gol and the 1984 Primera División.

In the Chilean Primera División, he also played for Coquimbo Unido, Deportes Temuco and Provincial Osorno. With Coquimbo Unido, they became the runners-up of 1991 Primera División and qualified to the 1992 Copa Libertadores.

He ended his career playing for Santiago Morning in the 1997 Primera B.

International career
Soto represented Chile at under-20 level in the 1983 South American Championship and scored a goal against Colombia in the first matchday.

At senior level, he represented the Chile national team in the 1983 Pan American Games

Post-retirement
He led , the trade union of professional football players in Chile, from 1998 to 2016, alongside former footballers such as Sergio Villegas and Ricardo Rojas. At the same time he studied laws. Once he graduated as a lawyer, he became a football agent in 2018.

Honours
Universidad Católica
 Chilean Primera División: 1984
 Copa Polla Gol: 1983
 Copa República: 1983

References

External links
 Carlos Soto at PlaymakerStats.com

1965 births
Living people
Footballers from Santiago
Chilean footballers
Chile under-20 international footballers
Chile international footballers
Club Deportivo Universidad Católica footballers
O'Higgins F.C. footballers
Coquimbo Unido footballers
Deportes Temuco footballers
Provincial Osorno footballers
Santiago Morning footballers
Chilean Primera División players
Primera B de Chile players
Association football midfielders